The Mar de Grau is the official name for the body of water in the Pacific Ocean under the control of the South American country of Peru. This body of water extends in length approximately 3,079.50 km, from the parallel of the Boca de Capones in northern Peru to the parallel of the Punto Concordia and the parallel in front of the city of Tacna in southern Peru. In terms of width, the maritime zone extends from the Peruvian coast to 200 nautical miles (370.4 km) into the Pacific Ocean.

This maritime domain was officially named on May 24, 1984, in honor of Miguel Grau Seminario, a Peruvian military officer described in Peru and Bolivia as a hero from the War of the Pacific fought against Chile. During the war, Grau led the defense of the Peruvian and Bolivian coasts by holding off the Chilean Navy for six consecutive months, ultimately dying at sea amidst the decisive Battle of Angamos.

See also 
 Chilean–Peruvian maritime dispute
 Humboldt Current
 Miguel Grau Seminario
 Pacific Ocean
 War of the Pacific

References

Bibliography 
 "El Perú en los tiempos antiguos", Julio R. Villanueva Sotomayor, Empresa Periodística Nacional SAC, Lima, y Quebecor World Perú S.A. 2001
 "El Perú en los tiempos modernos", Julio R. Villanueva Sotomayor, Empresa Periodística Nacional SAC, Lima, y Quebecor World Perú S.A. 2002
 "Atlas del Perú", Juan Augusto Benavides Estrada, Editorial Escuela Nueva, Lima. 1995
 "Historia de la República del Perú [1822-1933]", Jorge Basadre Grohmann, Orbis Ventures SAC, 1939, 2005, Lima

External links 

 Marina de Guerra del Perú
 Noticiero sobre tratados limítrofes con Chile Parte 1
 Noticiero sobre tratados limítrofes con Chile Parte 2
 Decreto Supremo Nº 781 del Perú de 1947
 La frontera marítima en la región sur del Perú

Pacific Ocean
Bodies of water of Peru